and  are 2022 role-playing video games developed by Game Freak and published by Nintendo and The Pokémon Company for the Nintendo Switch. They are the first installments in the ninth generation of the Pokémon video game series. First announced in February 2022, they were released on 18 November 2022.

Unlike the previous instalments in the Pokémon franchise, Scarlet and Violet take place in an open world. The games take place in the Paldea region, based on the Iberian Peninsula. There are three separate stories the player can follow. Scarlet and Violet introduce 110 new Pokémon, alongside two new regional forms. The games maintain features from previous modern Pokémon games, including large open areas and Pokémon appearing in the overworld.

Scarlet and Violet received mixed reviews from critics. The games were praised for their open world formula and story, while their graphics and technical problems at launch received criticism. The games sold over 10 million copies in their first three days, making them Nintendo's biggest launch of all time. By the end of 2022 they sold over 20 million copies combined, making them the fourth best-selling Pokémon games of all time.

Gameplay

Pokémon Scarlet and Violet largely follow the same basic gameplay structure of previous Pokémon games, where players obtain creatures known as Pokémon, primarily through catching and trading and use them to explore the world and battle other Pokémon trainers.

Scarlet and Violet have open worlds, which include both urban areas and open wilderness without borders between the two, unlike previous instalments in the Pokémon series. In addition to this, progression through the games are up to the players, with three routes available to choose from, and objectives within routes can be done in any order.

The games introduce three new starter Pokémon, Sprigatito, Fuecoco, and Quaxly; and two new legendary Pokémon, Koraidon and Miraidon. To assist in travel, Koraidon or Miraidon can be used to traverse the environment. A mechanic called "Let's Go" will allow the player to send out a Pokémon to roam the overworld and automatically battle wild Pokémon. In addition, co-op play with up to three other players is included.

Scarlet and Violet introduce the Terastal phenomenon, which gives Pokémon a crystalline appearance, as well as changing a Pokémon's type to match that Pokémon's "Tera Type", as well as unlocking special moves such as Tera Blast, which, when used by a Terastallized Pokémon, becomes a move of the same type as the Pokémon’s Tera Type.

Plot

Setting

Pokémon Scarlet and Violet are set in the Paldea region of the Pokémon universe, which appears to be loosely based on the Iberian Peninsula. The region features diverse landscapes including lakes, wastelands, and mountain ranges. A large crater, named the Great Crater of Paldea, lies in the centre of the region, formed by a meteorite strike centuries before the events of the game. Inside the Crater is an area named Area Zero, where the Terastalization phenomenon was first discovered. The region is divided into 20 different areas; six located in the south, three located in the east, four located in the west and seven located in the north. The areas differs in Pokémon, some only bound to specific parts of the region. Small islands and rock formations are scattered throughout the region's lakes and borders.

Story
In Scarlet and Violet, the player attends either the Naranja or Uva Academy. The academy has an annual "Treasure Hunt", in which students are encouraged to seek something they treasure by exploring the region. After encountering either the legendary Pokémon Koraidon or Miraidon, who joins and assists the player despite having lost its ability to battle, the player is encouraged to participate in three stories: Victory Road, Starfall Street, and Path of Legends.

In Victory Road, Nemona—the Champion-ranked trainer that rivals the player, frequently battling them throughout their journey—asks that they complete all eight of the Paldea region's Pokémon Gyms. After they defeat the leaders of each Gym, they can reach Champion rank by defeating the region's Elite Four and Top Champion Geeta. After becoming Champion rank, Nemona challenges the player to a final battle.

Starfall Street begins after the player helps the shy schoolgirl Penny stand up against Team Star, a group responsible for academy bullying, when Cassiopeia—the founder of Team Star and the secret identity of Penny—enlists them into "Operation Starfall", which aims to force Team Star to disband by defeating all five of its squad bosses, stripping them of their authority within the group. They are assisted by academy director Clavell, who is aiming to discover Team Star's origins while disguised as a student named Clive, and Penny, who wants to monitor the player in-person in addition to guiding them as Cassiopeia. They learn that Team Star was founded to counter bullying rather than cause it, and them confronting their bullies eighteen months prior caused the bullies to drop out and several academy staff members to resign. After defeating all squad bosses, Penny meets the player in the schoolyard to reveal her identity and challenge them to a battle. After her defeat, Clavell removes his disguise and offers peace with Team Star, though he subjects its members to community service as punishment for several violations.

Arven, aiming to locate the five legendary Herba Mystica, asks the player to join them in the Path of Legends story. To obtain each Herba Mystica, the player and Arven must team up to defeat a "Titan Pokémon"—a large Pokémon powered up by the Herba Mystica. Arven wishes to use the Herba Mystica to restore the health of his pet Mabosstiff, who was injured by a Pokémon in Area Zero—the workplace of his parent, either Professor Sada or Turo. After defeating all five Titans, Arven and the player use the Herba Mystica to restore the health of Mabosstiff and regain Koraidon/Miraidon's lost powers. Arven then challenges the player to a final battle, before being called by the professor to go to Area Zero with either the Scarlet or Violet Book. However, Arven decides that they must recruit further allies before journeying to Area Zero.

After choosing Nemona and Penny for assistance, Arven and the player set out towards the Zero Lab, the professor's laboratory in Area Zero. Inside, they encounter Paradox Pokémon—biological relatives of extinct Pokémon from either the ancient past or far future. After reaching the laboratory, the professor reveals themselves to be an AI substitute of the true professor, who was killed in a laboratory incident some time ago. The AI reveals that the original professor created a time machine to retrieve Paradox Pokémon and that the AI is to maintain it at all costs. The AI urges the player to shut down the time machine to preserve Paldea's ecology, though it is forced by its programming to battle the player. After initially being defeated, the AI's security protocols leave the player with no option except for their Koraidon or Miraidon to defeat the AI's own. This causes the time machine to fail, and the AI travels to the alternate time to allow for the machine's destruction, apologizing to Arven for the original professor neglecting him as a child before departing. Returning to the academy, Nemona, Clavell, and Geeta organize a Pokémon battling tournament between faculty and students. After evaluating all previous Gyms, the player emerges victorious in the tournament.

Development
Pokémon Scarlet and Violet started development in late 2019, around the time that Pokémon Sword and Shield released. Toby Fox assisted in composing some of the music featured in the games.

Marketing and release
Pokémon Scarlet and Violet were announced as part of a Pokémon Presents presentation on 27 February 2022, through a partially live-action trailer. Throughout the games' pre-release marketing, several in-universe videos have been published by The Pokémon Company, such as a camera trap to reveal Grafaiai, a web seminar to reveal Wiglett, a livestream to reveal Bellibolt, and a short found footage trailer to reveal Greavard.

On 1 June 2022, a second trailer was released, showing the two box cover legendary Pokémon along with more gameplay footage, three new Pokémon, and new characters.

On 3 August 2022, a third trailer was released alongside an overview trailer during a Pokémon Presents. These trailers revealed two new Pokémon, the return of regional variants as showcased with Paldean Wooper, the name of the region, a new battle mechanic known as the Terastal Phenomenon, as well as other details.

During the closing ceremony of the 2022 Pokémon World Championships on 21 August 2022, a new trailer was released that showcased a new Pokémon, Cyclizar, as well as new items and abilities to be used in competitive play. 

A fourth trailer, released on 7 September 2022 and titled "Seek Your Treasure!", detailed the three stories that the player can experience, as well as three new Pokémon. Characters such as Mela, Brassius, and Geeta also made their debut in the trailer. 

On 29 September 2022, singer Ed Sheeran released a song titled "Celestial" in collaboration with The Pokémon Company that appeared in Pokémon Scarlet and Violet. Ed Sheeran's song would later be used in the games, after you beat the game the credits will roll and it will play the song. 

On 6 October 2022, a 14-minute trailer was released, highlighting the unique gameplay between four different players, each going on a different "path" in the story, as well as Farigiraf, Girafarig's evolution. 

A special edition Nintendo Switch OLED model with themed artwork was released on 4 November 2022. 

On 11 November 2022, a week before the games come out, a Splatfest themed around the three starter types was held in Splatoon 3.

Pokémon Scarlet and Violet were released worldwide on 18 November 2022.

On 1 December 2022, Nintendo apologized for the issues players encountered and announced the 1.1.0 update which fixes some bugs.

Downloadable content 
During a Pokémon Presents on 27 February, 2023, a two-part downloadable content pack titled The Hidden Treasure of Area Zero was announced. The DLC will come in two parts: The Teal Mask, with the Legendary Pokémon Ogerpon, slated for release in fall 2023, and The Indigo Disk, with the Legendary Pokémon Terapagos, slated for release in winter 2023. The DLCs will introduce over 230 returning Pokémon that did not appear in the base game.

In The Teal Mask, the player embarks on a school trip organized by the academy to the land of Kitakami, which would also coincide with a festival in the village, while in The Indigo Disk, the player will study at Naranja/Uva Academy's sister school, Blueberry Academy, as an exchange student.

Reception

Critical response

Scarlet and Violet received "mixed or average reviews", according to review aggregator Metacritic, making them the lowest-rated mainline series Pokémon games on the platform.

Publications criticized the games for suffering from graphical glitches and poor performance. The graphics were also considered to be lackluster, with comparisons to other Nintendo Switch titles such as Xenoblade Chronicles 3. Eurogamer writer Oliver Mackenzie called the games "comprehensive technical failures", criticizing the games' poor texture quality and crudely modeled environments. Due to the performance issues, some players began requesting refunds of the games soon after launch, which Nintendo granted in most cases. IGN writer Rebekah Valentine adds that the games' innovative design is undermined by the numerous ways they feel deeply unfinished.

GameSpot writer Jeff Dekker regarded the non-linearity of the games as their "strength", while Nintendo Life described the experience as capturing the "real magic" of the first Pokémon games, Red and Blue. The latter also praised the story as "wholesome" and offering "genuinely tender moments".

Sales
According to The Pokémon Company, Scarlet and Violet are the most pre-ordered titles in the series' history. Within three days of its release, the games had sold over 10 million copies worldwide, including 4.05 million in Japan alone. The sales figure was the highest of any software on any Nintendo platform within three days, and the best launch of any console-exclusive game in history. The games were the best-selling video game titles of 2022 in Japan. By 31 December 2022, the games had sold 20.61 million copies.

See also
 List of generation IX Pokémon

Notes

References

External links
 

2022 video games
Game Freak games
Japanese role-playing video games
Multiplayer and single-player video games
Nintendo Switch games
Nintendo Switch-only games
Open-world video games
Scarlet and Violet
Role-playing video games
Video game sequels
Video games developed in Japan
Video games scored by Junichi Masuda
Video games scored by Toby Fox
Video games set in Spain
Video games with alternative versions
Video games featuring protagonists of selectable gender
Video games about time travel
Video games with customizable avatars